Jose Ragandap Ping-ay (April 13, 1950 – September 18, 2020) was a Filipino politician who was Congressman in the 14th and 15th Congress as Partylist Representative of Coop-NATCCO. He served as Vice Mayor of his hometown Santa Cruz and
was a Sangguniang Panlalawigan Member (Provincial Legislature) of the province of Ilocos Sur.

Biography 
Jose Ping-ay was born on June 13, 1950, in Santa Cruz, Ilocos Sur. He is the eldest among the three children. He studied in Saint Louis University in Baguio City and become a civil engineer by profession. He is the proprietor and General Manager of Jose R. Ping-ay Agri-Trading and Jose R. Ping-ay Engineering and Construction. 
He earned his Bachelor of Science in Civil Engineering degree at Saint Louis University in 1972 and was awarded Most Outstanding Group Coordinator when he completed a special course in urban and regional planning at the University of the Philippines in 1978.

Political career 
 Ping-ay served as Provincial Board Member of 2nd District of Ilocos Sur from 1995 to 1998  and Vice Mayor of his hometown from 2001 to 2004. The municipality of Santa Cruz has seen and experienced the last election with the incumbents having an opponent on the election of 2004 with Jose R. Ping-ay running as Mayor. After that, the incumbents were unopposed for the next five consecutive elections. It took another almost two decades for another Ping-ay to run against them with his son Waldimar Ping-ay for the election of 2022. He took over as COOP-NATCCO's representative in Congress after Guillermo Cua of Cagayan de Oro City died in December 2009. Ping-ay was sworn into office  in January 2009. In the May election of 2010, he bid for re-election as Partlylist Representative of Coop- Natcco. The party garnered 944, 864, or 3.42% of the overall votes, and at 6th place in over 178 participating parties. The party won 2 seats in congress.

Other work 
 Ping-ay made his mark in the national cooperative movement after steering the Sta. Cruz Savings and Development Cooperative  (SACDECO) which he chairs into a P236 million enterprise with five branches is a far cry from its petty status when it began in 1984 with P5,000 capital. Ping-ay previously served as a member of the Board of  National Confederation of Cooperatives (NATCCO) for two years before he was elected as chairperson of the board. During his term as chairperson in 2008 NATCCO reached the landmark first Billion in Assets, thus earning him the title "Action Man".  From 2006 up to 2009, Ping-ay is also the chairperson of the board and Founder of Ilocos Sur Cooperative Bank. Prior to it, he was ISCB's vice-chairperson. He was also the chairperson of the Board of Sta. Cruz Savings and Development Cooperative from 1989 to 1992 and again in 2005 to 2013. Similarly, he served as chairperson of the Board of NORLU-AGRI Marketing Cooperative from 1989 to 1992 and Northern Luzon Cooperative Development Center from 1990 to 1992. In 1989, he founded and chaired the board of Ilocos Sur Federation of Cooperatives until 1995. He too held other management positions as Vice Chairperson in Ilocos Sur Electric Cooperative and the National Confederation of Cooperatives.

Coop-NATCCO Partylist and its Role in Society
The Coop NATCCO is a party list which represents the cooperative sectors in the country. According to Cong. Ping-ay, Coop NATCCO's immediate concern is to push forward for reform in the policy of government towards fostering a better atmosphere of the cooperatives. He believe that through this, he will be able to respond to the growing needs of the co-operative sectors. Moreover, He wants the government to consider the cooperative sector as their partner in the implementation of the social development and property alleviation because in the past they noticed that the government don't trust the co-operative sector in that aspect and now they wanted to change it.

The Philippine Cooperative Code is considered a milestone by the Coop NATCCO party list since it is one of its more popular ones. The bill includes provisions that guarantee the survival and success of newly organized cooperatives. It allocates cooperative banks to perform thrift banking and commercial banking services and provides appropriate support to housing, market vendors and transport cooperatives. The bill also provides banking powers to qualified savings and credit coops.

Coop NATCCO party list has a number of programs offered to their members or even non-members. Cong. Ping-ay said “If we have the means then we support them.” Programs such as livelihood, infrastructure projects are offered to their network or members. They also have priority development assistance fund “We are very proud that every single centavo goes to the cooperatives in the country” said Cong. Ping-ay. Those funds can be used for the construction of their buildings, offices; multi-purpose building etc. it usually depends on their needs.

References

1950 births
2020 deaths
21st-century Filipino politicians
Saint Louis University (Philippines) alumni
Filipino civil engineers
Politicians from Ilocos Sur
Party-list members of the House of Representatives of the Philippines
Members of the House of Representatives of the Philippines from Ilocos Sur
Party-lists represented in the House of Representatives of the Philippines
Cooperative parties
Cooperatives in the Philippines